Christopher Arthur Lattner (born 1978) is an American software engineer, former Google and Tesla employee and co-founder of LLVM, Clang compiler, MLIR compiler infrastructure and the Swift programming language. , he is the co-founder and CEO at Modular AI, an artificial intelligence platform for developers. Before founding Modular AI, he worked as the President of Platform Engineering, SiFive after two years at Google Brain. Prior to that, he briefly served as Vice President of Autopilot Software at Tesla, Inc. and worked at Apple Inc. as Senior Director of the Developer Tools department, leading the Xcode, Instruments, and compiler teams.

Education 
Lattner studied computer science at the University of Portland, graduating in with a Bachelor of Science degree in 2000. While in Oregon, he worked as an operating system developer, enhancing Sequent Computer Systems's DYNIX/ptx. He moved to the University of Illinois at Urbana-Champaign where he was awarded a Master of Science degree in 2002, followed by a PhD in 2005 for research on optimizing pointer-intensive programs, supervised by Vikram Adve.

Career
Lattner is the current CEO of Modular AI, a company that is building a next-generation Artificial Intelligence (AI) developer platform. Previously he has worked at SiFive, Google, Tesla, Inc. and Apple Inc..

SiFive
Lattner joined SiFive in January 2020 and the board changes to ("SiFive 2.0"), Lattner led the RISC-V Product and Engineering organizations (everything excluding HR, finance, sales, customer support).

Google, Tesla and Apple
Lattner served as the Senior Director and Distinguished Engineer, TensorFlow Infrastructure and Technologies at Google from August 2017 - January 2020. Lattner served as the Vice President at Autopilot Software from January 30 - June 20, 2017, he was primarily responsible for creating Swift, the programming language for building apps on Apple platforms and one of the fastest growing languages for doing so on Linux.
Lattner served as the Senior Director and Architect, Developer Tools Department from January 2013 - January 2017 where he took over the entire team, took the responsibilities of the Xcode IDE Instruments performance analysis tool, Apple Java releases, and a variety of internal tools.

LLVM 
In late 2000, Lattner joined the University of Illinois at Urbana-Champaign as a research assistant and M.Sc. student. While working with Vikram Adve, he designed and began implementing LLVM, an innovative infrastructure for optimizing compilers, which was the subject of his 2002 Master of Science thesis.

In 2005, Apple Inc. hired Lattner to begin work bringing LLVM to production quality for use in Apple products. Over time, Lattner built out the technology, personally implementing many major new features in LLVM, formed and built a team of LLVM developers at Apple, started the Clang project, took responsibility for evolving Objective-C (contributing to the blocks language feature, and driving the ARC and Objective-C literals features), and nurtured the open source community (leading it through many open source releases). Apple first shipped LLVM-based technology in the 10.5 (and 10.4.8) OpenGL stack as a just-in-time (JIT) compiler, shipped the llvm-gcc compiler in the integrated development environment (IDE) Xcode 3.1, Clang 1.0 in Xcode 3.2, Clang 2.0 (with C++ support) in Xcode 4.0, and LLDB, libc++, assemblers, and disassembler technology in later releases.

Lattner's work involved designing, implementing, and evangelizing the LLVM and Clang compilers, productizing and driving the debugger LLDB, and overseeing development of the low-level toolchain. As of 2016, LLVM technologies are the core of Apple's developer tools and the default toolchain on FreeBSD.

In June 2010, the Association for Computing Machinery (ACM) Special Interest Group on programming languages (SIGPLAN) gave Lattner its inaugural ACM SIGPLAN Programming Languages Software Award "for his design and development of the Low Level Virtual Machine", noting that Professor Adve has stated: "Lattner’s talent as a compiler architect, together with his programming skills, technical vision, and leadership ability were crucial to the success of LLVM."

In April 2013, the ACM awarded Lattner its Software System Award, which is presented to anyone "recognized for developing a software system that has had a lasting influence, reflected in contributions to concepts, in commercial acceptance, or both".

Swift 
Lattner began developing the Swift programming language in 2010, with the eventual collaboration of many other programmers. On June 2, 2014, the WWDC app became the first publicly released app that used Swift.

Swift is an open source programming language with first-class functions for iOS and macOS development, created by Apple and introduced at Apple's developer conference Apple Worldwide Developers Conference (WWDC) 2014.

Swift is designed to coexist with Objective-C, the object-oriented programming language formerly preferred by Apple, and to be more resilient against erroneous code. It is built with the LLVM compiler included in Xcode 6.

Lattner announced that the project lead role had been transferred to Ted Kremenek, and that Lattner would leave Apple in January 2017.

MLIR 
Lattner is the co-founder of MLIR compiler infrastructure, a compiler that aims to address software fragmentation, improve compilation for heterogeneous hardware, significantly reduce the cost of building domain specific compilers, and aid in connecting existing compilers together.

Personal life
Lattner is married to Tanya Lattner, a co-founder, president and chief operating officer (COO) of the LLVM Foundation since 2015.

References

1978 births
Living people
Grainger College of Engineering alumni
Apple Inc. employees
American computer programmers
American computer scientists
University of Portland alumni
Google employees
Tesla, Inc. people